The Dream Cycle is a series of short stories and novellas by author H. P. Lovecraft (1890–1937). Written between 1918 and 1932, they are about the "Dreamlands", a vast alternate dimension that can only be entered via dreams.

Geography
The Dreamlands are divided into four regions:

 The West contains the Steps of Deeper Slumber (descended via the "Cavern of Flame") and the Enchanted Woods, by which many enter the Dreamlands. Other points of interest include the port of Dylath-Leen, one of the Dreamlands' largest cities; the town of Ulthar, "where no man may kill a cat"; the coastal jungle city of Hlanith; and the desert trading capital Illarnek. Here lies the fabled Land of Mnar, whose gray stones are etched with signs and where rise the ruins of the great Sarnath.
 The South, home of the isle of Oriab and the areas known as the Fantastic Realms (described in "The White Ship").
 The East, home of Celephaïs, a city dreamt into being by its monarch Kuranes, greatest of all recorded dreamers, and the dangerous Forbidden Lands.
 The North, location of the feared Plateau of Leng, home of man-eating spiders and the satyr-like "Men of Leng".

Other locales include the Underworld, a subterranean region underneath the Dreamlands inhabited by various monsters; the Moon, accessible via a ship and inhabited by toad-like "moon-beasts" allied with Nyarlathotep; and Kadath, a huge castle atop a mountain and the domain of the "Great Ones", the gods of Earth's Dreamland.

Evidently all dreamers see the Dreamlands slightly differently, as Atal, High Priest of Ulthar, mentions that everyone has their own dreamland. In the same sentence he says the Dreamlands that many know is a "general land of vision".

Bibliography
 The Dream Cycle of H. P. Lovecraft: Dreams of Terror and Death. Del Rey, 1985.

Contents:
 "Polaris" (1918)
"The White Ship" (1919)
 "The Doom That Came to Sarnath" (1919)
 "The Cats of Ulthar" (1920)
 "Celephaïs" (1920)
"Ex Oblivione" (1920)
"Nyarlathotep" (1920)
 "The Quest of Iranon" (1921)
"The Nameless City" (reference only) (1921)
 "The Other Gods" (1921)
"Azathoth" (1922)
"The Hound" (reference only) (1922)
 "Hypnos" (1922)
"What the Moon Brings" (1922)
 "The Outsider" (1926)
 "The Silver Key" (1926)
 "The Strange High House in the Mist" (1926)
 The Dream-Quest of Unknown Kadath (1927)
The Case of Charles Dexter Ward (reference only) (1927)
"The Thing in the Moonlight" (Based on a letter written to Donald Wandrei. Written by J. Chapman Miske) (1927. Published 1941)
 At the Mountains of Madness (reference only) (1931)
"The Dreams in the Witch House" (roughly connected) (1932)
 "Through the Gates of the Silver Key" (with E. Hoffmann Price) (1932)

Other 
Myers, Gary (1975). House of the Worm. Sauk City, WI: Arkham House. .
Brian Lumley wrote books set in Lovecraft's Dreamlands as well, beginning with "Hero of Dreams" in 1989.

Jonathan L. Howard (2011). Johannes Cabal: The Fear Institute. Headline Publishing Group. .

Myers, Gary (2013). The Country of the Worm: Excursions Beyond the Wall of Sleep. CreateSpace. .
Multiple Authors (2016).  Kill Those Damn Cats - Cats of Ulthar Lovecraftian Anthology.  First United Church of Cthulhu.  .
The Dream Quest of Vellit Boe by Kij Johnson, 2016, Tor, ISBN 978-0765391414

References

External links
 
 
 
 
 
 
 
 

Book series introduced in 1918
Works by H. P. Lovecraft
Fantasy books by series
Dreams in fiction
Parallel universes in fiction